Bozhurovo  or Bojurovo is a village in the municipality of Varbitsa, located in the Shumen Province of northeastern Bulgaria. As of 2007, the village had a population of 259 people.

References

Villages in Shumen Province